Maria Moutsidis, known professionally as Maria Mercedes, is an Australian television, film and stage actress. Her notable roles include the original Australian productions of the musicals Nine, Sunset Boulevard and Love Never Dies.

Stage
In 2014/15, Mercedes played opera star Maria Callas to critical acclaim and a sold out season of the Terrence McNally play Master Class at fortyfivedownstairs Melbourne.

In March 2016, she joined the cast of a new play Taxithi by Helen Yotis Patterson, the telling of Greek women migrating to Australia during the 1950s, 1960s and 1970s. The play is a series of monologues, interspersed with traditional Greek music and songs of the time. The piece resonated deeply with Maria as her own parents' stories of migration resonated within the stories of Taxithi. For the first time in Maria's theatrical career she was given the opportunity to sing in Greek.

Filmography

Filmography

FILM

Television

TELEVISION

References

External links

Year of birth missing (living people)
Living people
Australian people of Greek descent
Australian film actresses
Australian musical theatre actresses
Australian soap opera actresses
20th-century Australian actresses
21st-century Australian actresses